Ubombo Ranches Airfield  is an airport serving the sugar refinery town of Big Bend in Lubombo Region, Eswatini. The runway is just west of the refinery.

The Ubombo non-directional beacon (Ident: UB) is on the field.

See also
Transport in Eswatini
List of airports in Eswatini

References

External links
 OpenStreetMap - Ubombo Ranches Airfield
 OurAirports - Ubombo Ranches Airport
 FallingRain - Ubombo Ranches Airport
 
 Google Earth

Airports in Eswatini